The 1964 New Hampshire Wildcats football team was an American football team that represented the University of New Hampshire as a member of the Yankee Conference during the 1964 NCAA College Division football season. In its 15th year under head coach Chief Boston, the team compiled a 1–6–1 record (0–4–1 against conference opponents) and finished last out of six teams in the Yankee Conference.

Schedule

References

New Hampshire
New Hampshire Wildcats football seasons
New Hampshire Wildcats football